UTC+01:30 is an identifier for a time offset from UTC of +01:30.

History
It was used by the then-governments of the Orange Free State, Transvaal and the Cape Colony from 1892 to 1903 in what is now South Africa. This time zone was also used briefly by the former German South West Africa (present-day Namibia).

See also
History of time zones in Namibia
History of time zones in South Africa

References

UTC offsets
Time in South Africa